Scrobipalpa occulta is a moth in the family Gelechiidae. It was described by Povolný in 2002. It is found in Turkey, the Altai Mountains and the southern Ural mountains.

References

Scrobipalpa
Moths described in 2002